The  struck the Kantō Plain on the main Japanese island of Honshū at 11:58:44 JST (02:58:44 UTC) on Saturday, September 1, 1923. Varied accounts indicate the duration of the earthquake was between four and ten minutes. Extensive firestorms and even a fire whirl added to the death toll. The Kantō Massacre began on the day of the earthquake.

The earthquake had a magnitude of 7.9 on the moment magnitude scale, with its focus deep beneath Izu Ōshima Island in Sagami Bay. The cause was a rupture of part of the convergent boundary where the Philippine Sea Plate is subducting beneath the Okhotsk Plate along the line of the Sagami Trough.

Drills, as well as knowledge promotion events, are centered around that date as well as awards ceremonies for people of merit.

Earthquake
The SS Dongola captain reported that, while he was anchored in Yokohama's inner harbor:

This earthquake devastated Tokyo, the port city of Yokohama, and the surrounding prefectures of Chiba, Kanagawa, and Shizuoka, and caused widespread damage throughout the Kantō region.

Estimated casualties totaled about 142,800 deaths, including about 40,000 who went missing and were presumed dead.  According to the Japanese construction company Kajima Kobori Research's conclusive report of September 2004, 105,385 deaths were confirmed in the 1923 quake.

The damage from this natural disaster was one of the greatest sustained by Imperial Japan. In 1960, on the 37th anniversary of the quake, the government declared September 1 an annual "Disaster Prevention Day".

Damage and deaths 
Because the earthquake struck when people were cooking meals, many were killed as a result of large fires that broke out. Fires started immediately after the earthquake. Some fires developed into firestorms that swept across cities. Many people died when their feet became stuck on melting tarmac. The single greatest loss of life was caused by a fire whirl that engulfed the Rikugun Honjo Hifukusho (formerly the Army Clothing Depot) in downtown Tokyo, where about 38,000 people were incinerated after taking shelter there after the earthquake. The earthquake broke water mains all over the city, and putting out the fires took nearly two full days until late in the morning of September 3.

A strong typhoon centered off the coast of the Noto Peninsula in Ishikawa Prefecture brought high winds to Tokyo Bay at about the same time as the earthquake. These winds caused fires to spread rapidly.

The Emperor and Empress were staying at Nikko when the earthquake struck Tokyo, and were never in any danger. American Acting Consul General Max David Kirjassoff and his wife Alice Josephine Ballantine Kirjassoff died in the earthquake. The consulate itself lost the entirety of its records in the subsequent fires.

Many homes were buried or swept away by landslides in the mountainous and hilly coastal areas in western Kanagawa Prefecture; about 800 people died. A collapsing mountainside in the village of Nebukawa, west of Odawara, pushed the entire village and a passenger train carrying over 100 passengers, along with the railway station, into the sea.

The RMS Empress of Australia was about to leave Yokohama harbor when the earthquake struck. It narrowly survived and assisted in rescuing 2000 survivors. A P&O liner,  Dongola, was also in the harbor at the moment of disaster and rescued 505 people, taking them to Kobe.

The tsunami caused many deaths, including about 100 people along Yui-ga-hama Beach in Kamakura and an estimated 50 people on the Enoshima causeway. Over 570,000 homes were destroyed, leaving an estimated 1.9 million homeless. Evacuees were transported by ship from Kantō to as far as Kobe in Kansai. The damage is estimated to have exceeded US$1 billion (or about $ billion today). There were 57 aftershocks.

Ensuing violence 

Ethnic Koreans were massacred after the earthquake. The Home Ministry declared martial law and ordered all sectional police chiefs to make maintenance of order and security a top priority. A false rumor was spread that Koreans were taking advantage of the disaster, committing arson and robbery, and were in possession of bombs. Anti-Korean sentiment was heightened by fear of the Korean independence movement. In the confusion after the quake, mass murder of Koreans by mobs occurred in urban Tokyo and Yokohama, fueled by rumors of rebellion and sabotage. The government reported that 231 Koreans were killed by mobs in Tokyo and Yokohama in the first week of September. Independent reports said the number of dead was far higher, ranging from 6,000 to 10,000. Some newspapers reported the rumors as fact, including the allegation that Koreans were poisoning wells. The numerous fires and cloudy well water, a little-known effect of a large quake, all seemed to confirm the rumors of the panic-stricken survivors who were living amidst the rubble. Vigilante groups set up roadblocks in cities, and tested civilians with a shibboleth for supposedly Korean-accented Japanese: deporting, beating, or killing those who failed. Army and police personnel colluded in the vigilante killings in some areas. Of the 3,000 Koreans taken into custody at the Army Cavalry Regiment base in Narashino, Chiba Prefecture, 10% were killed at the base, or after being released into nearby villages. Moreover, anyone mistakenly identified as Korean, such as Chinese, Ryukyuans, and Japanese speakers of some regional dialects, suffered the same fate. About 700 Chinese, mostly from Wenzhou, were killed. A monument commemorating this was built in 1993 in Wenzhou.

In response, the government called upon the Japanese Army and the police to protect Koreans; 23,715 Koreans were placed in protective custody across Japan, 12,000 in Tokyo alone.  The chief of police of Tsurumi (or Kawasaki by some accounts) is reported to have publicly drunk the well water to disprove the rumor that Koreans had been poisoning wells.  In some towns, even police stations into which Korean people had escaped were attacked by mobs, whereas in other neighborhoods, civilians took steps to protect them. The Army distributed flyers denying the rumor and warning residents against attacking Koreans, but in many cases, vigilante activity only ceased as a result of Army operations against it. In several documented cases, soldiers and policemen participated in the killings, and in other cases, authorities handed groups of Koreans over to local vigilantes, who proceeded to kill them.

Amidst the mob violence against Koreans in the Kantō Region, regional police and the Imperial Army used the pretext of civil unrest to liquidate political dissidents.

Director Chongkong Oh made two documentary films about the pogrom: Hidden Scars: The Massacre of Koreans from the Arakawa River Bank to Shitamachi in Tokyo (1983) and The Disposed-of Koreans: The Great Kanto Earthquake and Camp Narashino (1986). They largely consist of interviews with survivors, witnesses, and perpetrators. 

The importance of obtaining and providing accurate information following natural disasters has been emphasized in Japan ever since. Earthquake preparation literature in modern Japan almost always directs citizens to carry a portable radio and use it to listen to reliable information, and not to be misled by rumors in the event of a large earthquake.

Aftermath 

Following the devastation of the earthquake, some in the government considered the possibility of moving the capital elsewhere. Proposed sites for the new capital were even discussed.

Japanese commentators interpreted the disaster as an act of divine punishment to admonish the Japanese people for their self-centered, immoral, and extravagant lifestyles.  In the long run, the response to the disaster was a strong sense that Japan had been given an unparalleled opportunity to rebuild the city and rebuild Japanese values.  In reconstructing the city, the nation, and the Japanese people, the earthquake fostered a culture of catastrophe and reconstruction that amplified discourses of moral degeneracy and national renovation in interwar Japan.

After the earthquake, Gotō Shinpei organized a reconstruction plan of Tokyo with modern networks of roads, trains, and public services.  Parks were placed all over Tokyo as refuge spots, and public buildings were constructed with stricter standards than private buildings to accommodate refugees.  The outbreak of World War II and subsequent destruction severely limited resources.

Frank Lloyd Wright received credit for designing the Imperial Hotel, Tokyo, to withstand the quake, although in fact the building was damaged, though standing, by the shock.  The destruction of the US embassy caused Ambassador Cyrus Woods to relocate the embassy to the hotel.  Wright's structure withstood the anticipated earthquake stresses, and the hotel remained in use until 1968. The innovative design used to construct the Imperial Hotel, and its structural fortitude, inspired the creation of the popular Lincoln Logs toy.

The unfinished battlecruiser Amagi was in drydock being converted into an aircraft carrier in Yokosuka in compliance with the Washington Naval Treaty of 1922. The earthquake damaged the ship's hull beyond repair, leading it to be scrapped, and the unfinished fast battleship Kaga was converted into an aircraft carrier in its place.

In contrast to London, where typhoid fever had been steadily declining since the 1870s, the rate in Tokyo remained high, more so in the upper-class residential northern and western districts than in the densely populated working-class eastern district. An explanation is the decline of waste disposal, which became particularly serious in the northern and western districts when traditional methods of waste disposal collapsed due to urbanization. The 1923 earthquake led to record-high morbidity due to unsanitary conditions following the earthquake, and it prompted the establishment of antityphoid measures and the building of urban infrastructure.

The Honda Point Disaster on the West Coast of the United States, in which seven US Navy destroyers ran aground and 23 people died, has been attributed to navigational errors caused by unusual currents set up by the earthquake in Japan.

Memory
Beginning in 1960, every September 1st is designated as Disaster Prevention Day to commemorate the earthquake and remind people of the importance of preparedness, as August and September are the peak of the typhoon season. Schools and public and private organizations host disaster drills.  Tokyo is located near a fault zone beneath the Izu Peninsula which, on average, causes a major earthquake about once every 70 years, and is also located near the Sagami Trough, a large subduction zone that has potential for large earthquakes. Every year on this date, schools across Japan take a moment of silence at the precise time the earthquake hit in memory of the lives lost.

Some discreet memorials are located in Yokoamicho Park in Sumida Ward, at the site of the open space in which an estimated 38,000 people were killed by a single fire whirl. The park houses a Buddhist-style memorial hall/museum, a memorial bell donated by Taiwanese Buddhists, a memorial to the victims of World War II Tokyo air raids, and a memorial to the Korean victims of the vigilante killings.

In fiction

In written or graphic novels 
In the historical fantasy novel Teito Monogatari (Hiroshi Aramata) a supernatural explanation is given for the cause of the Great Kantō earthquake, connecting it with the principles of feng shui.

In Yasunari Kawabata's 1930 novel The Scarlet Gang of Asakusa several chapters deal with the Great Kantō earthquake.

In one scene in the book, Japan Sinks (by Sakyo Komatsu), due to the fast-moving subduction of the Pacific and Eurasian plates, the Sagami Trough ruptures in a magnitude-8.5 earthquake, killing several million people in Tokyo and other areas, causing major tsunamis, and creating major firestorms. In the film adaptation of Japan Sinks,  Nihon Chinbotsu, the Sagami Trough ruptures in a massive earthquake called "The Second Great Kanto Earthquake". In the manga (comic) adaptation of Japan Sinks, the Second Kantō Earthquake killed over five million.

In the TV adaptation of the Pachinko Novel by Min Jin Lee, a young Hansu escapes Yokohama with his father's former Yakuza employer, Ryoichi, from the Great Kantō Earthquake. The Great Kantō Earthquake is not featured in the book. 

In Oswald Wynd's novel The Ginger Tree, Mary Mackenzie survives the earthquake, and later bases her clothes designing company in one of the few buildings that remained standing in the aftermath.

In film or animation 
An incident after the Great Kanto earthquake is recreated in the 1998 film, After Life, known in Japanese as Wandafuru Raifu (or Wonderful Life). Directed by Hirokazu Kore-eda, the plot takes place in a way station for those who have just died. The newly deceased will take their happiest memory with them into the afterlife. One of the newly deceased has a memory of being in the woods after the earthquake. 

Michiyo Akaishi's josei manga Akatsuki no Aria features the earthquake in volume 8. Several places frequented by the protagonist Aria Kanbara, like her boarding school and the house of the rich Nishimikado clan that she is an illegitimate member of, become shelters for the wounded and the homeless. Aria's birth mother is severely injured by debris and later dies, and this triggers a subplot about Aria's own heritage.

In Yuu Watase's 2017 josei manga Fushigi Yûgi Byakko Senki, the heroine Suzuno Osugi enters The Universe of the Four Gods for the first time right after the earthquake: her father Takao, who is dying from injuries he suffered when the family house fatally collapsed on him and Suzuno's mother Tamayo, orders her to do so, so she will survive the disaster and its aftermath. After a brief time there, she's sent back to the already destroyed Tokyo, and she, alongside her soon-to-be love interest Seiji Horie and two young boys named Hideo and Kenichi, is taken in by a friend of the late Takao, Dr. Oikawa.

Waki Yamato's manga Haikara-san ga Tōru actually reaches its climax after the Great Kantō earthquake—which happens right before the wedding of the female lead, Benio Hanamura, and her second love Tousei. Benio barely survives when the Christian church she's getting married in collapses, and then she finds her long-lost love Shinobu whose other love interest Larissa is among the victims; they get back together, and Tousei allows them to.

In Makiko Hirata's josei manga and anime Kasei Yakyoku the story finishes some time after the earthquake, as a corollary to the main love triangle between the noblewoman Akiko Hashou, her lover Taka Itou, and Akiko's personal maid Sara Uchida. The earthquake happens just as the marriage between Akiko and her fiancé Kiyosu Saionji is announced. Sara is in the streets, and Taka is taking Sara's brother Junichirou to a hospital after he was injured in a yakuza-related incident. The Hashou's mansion is destroyed, leading to an emotional confrontation between Akiko and Saionji; meanwhile, Sara's humble house in the suburbia is also destroyed and her and Junichirou's mother dies of injuries she sustained in the earthquake.

Maurice Tourneur's 1924 silent film Torment has an earthquake in Yokohama in its plot, and uses footage of the Kantō earthquake in the film.

In the animated series, Tokyo Magnitude 8.0, the Sagami Trough ruptures in a magnitude-8.0 earthquake, killing over 200,000 in Tokyo, causing floods and fires, and putting the main character at risk.

Go Nagai's manga Violence Jack is set in a scenario in which a gigantic earthquake called 'The Great Kanto Hellquake', reminiscent of the 1923 earthquake, devastates Tokyo and severs the Kanto region from the rest of Japan, as well as cutting it off from the outside world.

In the 2013 animated film by director Hayao Miyazaki, The Wind Rises, the protagonist Jiro Horikoshi is traveling to Tokyo by train to study engineering. On the way, the 1923 earthquake strikes, damaging the train and causing a huge fire in the city.

Part of the story in the manga and anime Taisho Otome Fairy Tale (by Sana Kirioka) happens during the earthquake. At that time Yuzuki was in Tokyo visiting a friend, causing Tamahiko to worry, and follow her to Tokyo.

See also

 1293 Kamakura earthquake
 1703 Genroku earthquake
 1906 San Francisco earthquake
 Amakasu Incident
 List of earthquakes in 1923
 List of earthquakes in Japan
 List of megathrust earthquakes

Notes

References and further reading

 Aldrich, Daniel P. "Social, not physical, infrastructure: the critical role of civil society after the 1923 Tokyo earthquake." Disasters 36.3 (2012): 398–419.
 
 
 Borland, Janet. "Voices of vulnerability and resilience: children and their recollections in post-earthquake Tokyo." Japanese Studies 36.3 (2016): 299–317.
 Clancey, Gregory. "The Changing Character of Disaster Victimhood: Evidence from Japan's 'Great Earthquakes'." Critical Asian Studies 48.3 (2016): 356–379.
 
 
 
 
 Hunter, Janet. "'Extreme confusion and disorder'? the Japanese economy in the Great Kantō earthquake of 1923." Journal of Asian Studies (2014): 753–773 online.
 Hunter, Janet, and Kota Ogasawara. "Price shocks in regional markets: Japan's Great Kantō Earthquake of 1923." Economic History Review 72.4 (2019): 1335–1362.
 
  Pdf.
 
 
 Weisenfeld, Gennifer. Imaging Disaster: Tokyo and the visual culture of Japan's Great Earthquake of 1923 (Univ of California Press, 2012).

External links

The Great Kantō earthquake of 1923 – Great Kanto Earthquake.com
Great Kanto Earthquake 1923 – Photographs by August Kengelbacher
Japan Earthquake 1923 – Pathé News
The Great Kanto Earthquake of 1923 – Brown University Library Center for Digital Scholarship
The Great Kanto Earthquake Massacre  – OhmyNews

1923 Great Kanto Earthquake – Fire Tornado – Video | Check123 – Video encyclopedia
Photograph Albums of the Great Mino-Owari (1891) and Great Kanto (1923) Earthquakes at the Amherst College Archives & Special Collections

 
Earthquakes of the Taishō period
Megathrust earthquakes in Japan
Natural disasters in Tokyo
Earthquakes in the Empire of Japan
1923 in Japan
Kanto, Great
1920s in Tokyo
Fires in Japan
Massacres in Japan
Racially motivated violence in Asia
Korea under Japanese rule
Anti-Korean sentiment in Japan
Anti-Korean violence
Zainichi Korean history
Urban fires in Asia
1923 tsunamis
1923
1923
September 1923 events
Landslides in Japan
Shindo 7 earthquakes
1923 disasters in Japan
1923 fires in Asia